Frederick or Fred Gregory may refer to:

 Frederick D. Gregory (born 1941), United States Air Force pilot and NASA astronaut
 Frederick Gugenheim Gregory (1893–1961), British botanist and plant physiologist
 Fred Gregory (footballer, born 1886) (1886–1937), English footballer
 Fred Gregory (footballer, born 1911) (1911–1985), English footballer